Arkansas Anime Festival (AF2) is an annual three-day anime convention held at the Four Points by Sheraton Bentonville in Bentonville, Arkansas. It is the largest anime convention in the state of Arkansas and is family friendly.

Programming
The convention typically offers an artists alley, a dance, live action role-playing game, masquerade, panels, tabletop gaming, a vendor room, video games.

History
For several years the convention happened two times per year. The March 2010 event had a free party before the convention. Arkansas Anime Festival 2020 was postponed due to the COVID-19 pandemic.

Event history

References

Other Related News Articles
Kick-off for Arkansas Anime Festival KHBS/KHOG-TV, Retrieved 2016-06-27

External links
 Arkansas Anime Festival Website

Anime conventions in the United States
Recurring events established in 2007
2007 establishments in Arkansas
Festivals in Arkansas
Tourist attractions in Benton County, Arkansas
Bentonville, Arkansas
Conventions in Arkansas